Ramdhanu is a 2014 Bengali family drama film directed by Nandita Roy and Shiboprosad Mukherjee. It was adapted from Suchitra Bhattacharya's short story, Ramdhanu Rawng. The film was produced by Windows and Jalan International Films and was presented by Atanu Raychaudhuri. It released on 6 June 2014 and had performed well at the box office. The film has been cinematographed by Sirsha Ray and edited by Moloy Laha. The film was remade in Malayalam as Salt Mango Tree.

Background
The Indian Parliament passed ‘The Right to Education Act’ or RTE Act - on 4 August 2009. One of the issues addressed in that was of school interviews. An order was passed that for admission, there should be no interviews of parents or children to ensure smooth enrollment for all. But was this ruling applicable to private schools? As the act came into being, the private schools protested, claiming it violated their right to run independently without government interference. The act was revised and made non-applicable to unaided, private and boarding schools. And so the interview process continued in private schools, this time disguised behind the term ‘interaction sessions’.

Plot Synopsis
Mitali (played by Gargi Roychowdhury) is a worried mother. Her 5-year-old son,  Gogol (played by Akashneel Mitra), has once again failed to pass the admission test in a reputed school and the application gets rejected. This is the fourth time and Mitali gets desperate. She is determined to get her only son admitted into a reputed school. Laltu Dutta (played by Shiboprosad Mukherjee), her husband, owns a chemist's shop, and all his efforts centre around running his business successfully. He is completely attached to his family and tries to do his best to fulfil his wife's aspirations. 

When one school after school starts rejecting Gogol, a despondent Mitali takes the advice of her friend and hires a teacher for Gogol's tuitions. Soon, Mitali gets disappointed by the young teacher's casual attitude and decides to teach Gogol herself. Mitali's desperation worries Laltu and he decides to go the extra mile to make his wife happy. He even approaches a tout and is willing to pay him a handsome amount if he can procure admission for his son. The tout claims that he can get his son admitted to any school for Rs 10 lakh. The sum is exorbitant. He does not know how to procure that amount. Should he terminate his fixed deposits? But that is his only savings! On the other hand, he cannot bear to see the disappointment on his wife's face each time their son gets rejected.

The family decides to go to Bolpur, in the district of Birbhum, West Bengal, where Mitali's parents reside. It is a special occasion as her brother is returning home from abroad after long, along with his foreigner wife. The holiday turns out to be interesting as Jennifer, the brother's wife, shows her keenness to adapt traditional Bengali customs, learn the language, and insist on speaking Bengali. She terms Mitali's insistence on getting her son admitted to an English-medium school and learning the English language as ‘linguistic imperialism'.

While Gogol spends a wonderful holiday with his grandparents and his new aunt, Mitali is anxiously waiting for the interview call for her son. When it finally arrives, they rush back home. The three of them attend the interview, but this time, Mitali feels it was Laltu who had ruined her son's chances by giving ludicrous answers to the questions put by the school's interview board. Mitali is furious. But she is not the one to give up hope so easily. She readies herself for the final bid. On the advice of another parent, Mitali decides to enroll herself along with her husband in a school that coaches parents to conduct themselves at interviews. Laltu is very reluctant at first but finally gives in to his wife's persuasions.

What follows is a poignant but hilarious journey as Laltu tries to learn the language, etiquette and build his confidence to face the toughest of situations. The teacher of the coaching school is a wonderful lady who handholds them into conducting themselves well at interviews and readies them to face difficulties and recognize the worth of life itself! Does Gogol finally get through to the interview? Will Mitali be able to fulfil her dreams or does she learn a greater lesson from all this and the importance of her child's well-being? Does Gogol's love for the song of birds, the flight of kites, the rustling of the leaves, the wide expanse of the blue sky, get crushed by the ambitions of his parent? Does Mitali finally look deep into her son's eye and realise what makes him truly happy? Does she finally follow her heart? Many such moments are captured in the story as it hurtles towards a dramatic climax.

Cast
 Gargi Roychowdhury as Mitali Dutta
 Shiboprosad Mukherjee as Laltu Dutta
 Rachana Banerjee as Madam
 Kharaj Mukherjee as Akash Singhania
 Akashneel Mitra as Gogol
 Rajat Ganguly as Sanju's father
 Rumki Chatterjee as Sanju's mother
 Chitra Sen as Mitali's mother in Bolpur
 Arijit Guha as Mitali's father in Bolpur
 Sasha Ghoshal Mitali's brother in Bolpur
 Suzanne Bernert as Mitali's sister-in-law in Bolpur.

Crew
 Produced by Windows and Jalan International Films
 Presented by Atanu Raychaudhuri
 Directed by Nandita Roy and Shiboprosad Mukherjee
 Screenplay & Dialogue by Nandita Roy & Shiboprosad Mukherjee
 Story inspired by Suchitra Bhattacharya
 Director of Photography Sirsha Ray
 Editor Maloy Laha
 Art Director Amit Chatterjee
 Sound by Anirban Sengupta & Dipankar Chaki
 Costume Designer Ruma Sengupta
 Music by Vinit Ranjan Moitra
 Background design by Vinit Ranjan Moitra
 Publicity Design by Saumik & Piyali

Direction
Nandita Roy is an Indian filmmaker, screenplay writer and producer. She has been working in the film industry for the past 30 years. She has worked in many television serials and National Award-winning films. Shiboprosad Mukherjee is an Indian filmmaker, actor and producer. He started his acting career by joining the Theatre in Education Project and was a regular theatre artiste at Nandikar. He learnt his art from celebrated thespians like Rudraprasad Sengupta and Ibrahim Alkazi. The director duo started directing films since 2011, with their first film Icche (2011). From then on, they have co-directed films like Accident (2012), Muktodhara (2012), Alik Sukh (2013), Ramdhanu (2014), Belaseshe (2015), Praktan (2016), Posto (2017), Haami (2018), Konttho (2019), Gotro (2019),Brahma Janen Gopon Kommoti (2020),Baba Baby O (2022), Lokkhi Chele(2022)  Belashuru (2022)  which have been critically acclaimed and commercially successful. Their films have been appreciated for their socially relevant content and entertaining narrative structure.

Casting
Shiboprosad Mukherjee’s acting career began in the year 1997 with director Kumar Shahani ‘Char Adhyay’ (Four Chapters). His next two films were with director Rituparno Ghosh, Dahan (Crossfire) in 1998 and Bariwali (The Landlady or The Lady of the House) in the year 2000, His next film was Jamai no.1 in 1998 with Nitish Roy, followed by Anup Singh Batala’s Ekti Nadir Naam (The Name of a River) in 2002. He then turned into actor – director in the films Accident in 2012 and Muktodhara in 2012 directed by Nandita Roy and himself. Rachna Banerjee is a popular actress in Oriya and Bengali Film Industry. She has done many films in Oriya, Bengali, Hindi, Telugu, Tamil and Kannada languages. Her acting career began in 1994. She has acted opposite legendary actors like Amitabh Bachchan in the Hindi film Sooryavansham and Mithun Chakraborty in Oriya and Bengali films. 
Gargi Roychowdhury, a popular actress of the Bengali screen, began her career as a theatre artist in 1995 with Bohurupee Theatre Group. Her first television work was in 1996 with Rituporno Ghosh’s Bahanno Episodes.  During that time she has also been a newscaster and radio artist. She has been the brand ambassador for many national and international companies.

Box office
After a decent 70% opening on 6 June, 'Ramdhanu' steadily attracted an audience, eventually settling for a 100% occupancy across theatres. While weekday collections rarely dropped below 70%, the weekends roared back to a near 100% occupancy. At Priya in south Kolkata, which had a single show, the collections crossed Rs 4.6 lakh in the very first week. Made on a budget of Rs 75 lakh, the film opened to a bumper response in the city, notching up more than Rs 70 lakh by the 3rd weekend and in turn, emerged as the most profitable film of the year so far. It eventually ran for 7 weeks in the direct centers of the city after which it continued for 2 more weeks in the shifted centers.

Response
The film received a good response from the audience. The actors' performances were credited highly. The film also did well in the box-office, especially when it was released with another star studded Bengali film, Game. Quoting the Times of India review, "Ramdhanu is a family drama with a touch of innocence and simplicity that will make you want to watch it again."

Remake
Rajesh Nair, director of Malayalam thriller Escape from Uganda, has remade this film in Malayalam, by the name of Salt Mango Tree. It released on 6 November 2015. Shiboprosad also quipped that they are also planning to remake the film in Hindi.

See also
 Muktodhara
 Accident
 Icche
 Alik Sukh
 Hindi Medium

References

External links
 

2014 films
Bengali films remade in other languages
Indian drama films
Bengali-language Indian films
2010s Bengali-language films
Films directed by Nandita Roy and Shiboprosad Mukherjee
Films based on works by Suchitra Bhattacharya